The knockout stage of the 2015 Cricket World Cup, following the group stage, was held from 18 to 29 March 2015. The top four teams from Pool A and Pool B advanced to the knockout stage to compete in a single-elimination style tournament. If a quarter-final or semi-final ended as a tie or no result, then the team which was placed higher in the group stages would have qualified. If the final ended in a tie, the match would have been decided by a one-over eliminator.

Of the eight teams entering the stage, the team finishing first on Pool A played the team finishing fourth in Pool B while the team finishing second in Pool A played the team finishing third in Pool B and so on, in the format A1 v B4, A2 v B3, A3 v B2 and A4 v B1. Hosts Australia and New Zealand had home advantage for the quarter-final and semi-final matches that they qualified for.

New Zealand, Australia, Sri Lanka, and Bangladesh qualified for this stage from Pool A, while India, South Africa, Pakistan and West Indies qualified from Pool B.

New Zealand, Australia, South Africa, and India qualified for the semi-finals by beating West Indies, Pakistan, Sri Lanka, and Bangladesh respectively. In the semi-finals, New Zealand beat South Africa and Australia beat India to qualify for the finals.

Tournament bracket

Matches

Quarter-finals

South Africa v Sri Lanka

India v Bangladesh

Australia v Pakistan

New Zealand v West Indies

Semi-finals

New Zealand v South Africa

Australia v India

Final

References

External links
2015 World Cup website

Knockout stage